Ribarci is a village in the municipality of Bosilegrad, Serbia. According to the 2002 census, the village has a population of 39 people.

References

Populated places in Pčinja District